Oropeza is a Spanish surname. Notable people with the surname include:

Enrique Priego Oropeza, Mexican politician
Renato Prada Oropeza (born 1937), Bolivian-Mexican scientist, literary researcher and writer
Jenny Oropeza (1957-2010), California State Senator
Jorge Oropeza (born 1983), Mexican footballer
Juan Oropeza (1906–1971), Venezuelan lawyer, diplomat, writer, educator and political science expert
Sam Oropeza (born 1985), American mixed martial artist
B. J. Oropeza (born 1961), American New Testament scholar and theologian
Luis José Oropeza (born 1946) Venezuelan poeta, writer ecology expert
Andrade "Cien" Almas, aka La Sombra, a  Mexican luchador

Spanish-language surnames